Five eyes or 5 Eyes may refer to:

 Five eyes (genus), the genus of plants Chamaesaracha
 Five Eyes, an intelligence alliance comprising Australia, Canada, New Zealand, the United Kingdom and the United States
 Operation Fortune: Ruse de guerre, an upcoming spy film was previously known as Five Eyes
 The Council of the 5 Eyes, a fictional terrorist organization from the videogame Police Quest: SWAT II
 FVEY (album) (pronounced 5 eyes), a 2014 alt-rock album by Shihad

See also

 
 
 
 
 The Technical Cooperation Program, a long-standing international organisation
 ECHELON
 Five-eyed flounder, a species of flatfish
 Many eyes (disambiguation)